Keel ja Kirjandus ('Language and Literature') is journal published in Estonia by Kultuurileht SA. Journal is compiled by Estonian Academy of Sciences and Estonian Writers' Union.

First number was published in 1958.

Journal is issued once per month.

Further reading
Rein Kruus. "Keel ja Kirjandus – 25". – Looming 1983, 3, pp 416–419
Kalle Kurg. "Ühisvaratundest". (Keel ja Kirjandus 25) – Looming 1983, 3, pp 420–421
Rudolf Põldmäe. "Keele ja Kirjanduse veerandsada aastat". – In book: "Kirjanduse jaosmaa '83". Compiled by Endel Mallene. Tallinn, Eesti Raamat 1985, pp 48–52

References

External links

Magazines published in Estonia
Estonian literature